Nelson County High School can refer to either of the following United States high schools:
Nelson County High School (Kentucky) in Bardstown, Kentucky
Nelson County High School (Virginia) in Lovingston, Virginia